Bishop Branch is a stream in Pike County in the U.S. state of Missouri. It is a tributary of Noix Creek.

Bishop Branch has the name of Joshua Bishop, a pioneer settler.

See also
List of rivers of Missouri

References

Rivers of Pike County, Missouri
Rivers of Missouri